Ex contractu, Latin for "from a contract", is a legal term that indicates a consequence of a contract. Ex contractu is often used to denote the source of a legal action (often as opposed to ex delicto).

It is often said that damages ex contractu will lie for nonfeasance, misfeasance and malfeasance; whereas damages ex delicto will only lie for misfeasance and malfeasance.

Latin legal terminology